Gjerdinga is an island in the municipality of Nærøysund in Trøndelag county, Norway. The island lies at the northern end of the Nærøysundet.  Most of the 20 residents of the island live in the village of Gjerdinga on the southeastern part of the island. The island is connected to the mainland by a ferry operated by Namsos Trafikkselskap. The ferry goes between Sæla (on the island) and Eidshaug (on Kvingra on the mainland) six times per day.

References

Villages in Trøndelag
Islands of Trøndelag
Nærøysund
Nærøy